Trachelophorus madegassus is a species of weevil in the family Attelabidae.  It is indigenous to Madagascar.

References 

Weevils
Beetles described in 1929